OwL Remix is a remix album by Duluth, Minnesota slowcore group Low, released in 1998.  Alan Sparhawk has stated that the band did not have input into the creation of the album.

Track listing
"Down (Porter Ricks Remix)" – 13:25
"Anon (Spore)" – 5:10
"Over The Ocean ('91 Party Dance Mix)" – 6:39
"Laugh (Vox-Reverse Tele)" – 5:44
"Anon (Pollen)" – 5:12
"Do You Know How To Waltz (Vert)" – 4:31
"Over The Ocean (Re-Remix Of Tranquility Bass '91 Party Dance Mix)" – 5:45
"Words (J + S Mix)" – 6:26

References

Low (band) remix albums
1998 remix albums